Empress Zhangxian Mingsu (章獻明肅皇后; lit. "The orderly, worthy, wise and solemn empress"), more commonly known as Empress Liu (劉皇后), was an empress of the Song dynasty, married to the Emperor Zhenzong in 1012 and quickly gained the emperor's trust to discuss government matters. She ruled unofficially as the regent of China during the illness of Emperor Zhenzong from 1020 until 1022, and then officially as regent during the minority of  Emperor Renzong from 1022 until her own death in 1033. As a regent, she commanded in her own name, not the name of the young emperor, she became the second woman in Chinese history to wear the imperial robe, after Wu Zetian, the only empress regnant in Chinese history.

Early life
Orphaned in infancy, Lady Liu was raised by maternal relatives, and by adolescence she became a singer skilled at hand-drums. She married Gong Mei (龔美), a silversmith who took her to the capital Kaifeng, where in 983, she entered the palace of prince Zhao Yuanxiu, one of the emperor's sons. According to anecdotes in historian Sima Guang's Sushui Jiwen, Gong Mei sold Lady Liu out of poverty, probably first to Zhang Qi (張耆), an official in the prince's palace. 

The 15-year-old Zhao Yuanxiu was greatly enamored of the 14-year-old entertainer. Once, the emperor remarked that his son was getting "listless and thinner", and Zhao Yuanxiu's strict wet nurse, apparently hating Lady Liu's likely crude behavior, promptly blamed her in front of the emperor. Lady Liu was forced to leave the palace, but the prince kept her at the house of Zhang Qi, who begrudgingly accepted her only after receiving 500 ounces of silver for the construction of a separate residence, so as to circumvent the emperor's order.

As imperial consort and empress
Zhao Yuanxiu, who later changed his name to Zhao Heng, became emperor after his father's death in 997. Returning to his side, Lady Liu was given the title of "Beautiful Lady" (美人) in 1004 and further promoted to "Xiuyi" (修儀) in 1009. As Empress Guo had died in 1007, the emperor wanted to make Consort Liu empress, but gave in after strong ministerial opposition.

In 1010, one of Consort Liu's servants, Lady Li, gave birth to a son, borne by the emperor. Already in her 40s and childless, Lady Liu adopted the infant and cared for him like her own. In 1012 she became Virtuous Consort Liu (劉德妃), and several months later, she became the empress.

Liu was described as naturally alert and perceptive, with a good judgement and an ability to make quick decisions.   She demonstrated these qualities in handling the palace affairs as empress, and she also learned enough to be able to understand and discuss the state affairs with the emperor.  This made him trust her with political tasks during his illness.

Empress regent

Regent for Emperor  Zhenzong
In 1020, Emperor Zhenzong became affected by an illness, which was to cause his death two years later, and unable to handle the affairs of state. By this time, the empress was already established as power behind the throne and handled the All affairs of state. She was to rule officially as powerful empress and unofficially as regent of China for the two remaining years of his life.

Regent for Emperor Renzong

In 1022, Emperor Zhenzong was succeeded by Emperor Renzong, who was twelve years old and thereby not of legal majority for another five years, in the will of Emperor Zhenzong it was stated:  The Empress Dowager Liu now openly and officially assumed all power as regent of China during his minority, and nothing and no one can restrict her in any way.   She enjoyed all the Imperial prerogatives and honors: she held court (with the child emperor by her side or often just herself), she addressed herself as Zhen, a first-person pronoun reserved for use by the emperor after the Qin dynasty. Officials addressed her as Bixia, Royal Majesty, an honorific used when addressing the emperor directly, not Dianxia, Royal Highness, an honorific used when addressing the empress or empress dowager directly, the edicts (敕, chi) she issued was referred to as Zhe (制), which was the personal orders of the emperor, she had her birthday celebrated with special names, she had envoys sent in her own name, and she even attended to the holy plowing ceremony and the imperial ancestral worship, all of which was normally only done by a ruling emperor. As a regent she became the second woman in Chinese history to wear the imperial robe, after Wu Zetian. Even according to the tradition of the emperors, but not empresses consort or empresses dowager, in order to build seven temples for her seven generations and to worship them with the titles of empire, Empress Dowager Liu promoted Liu's ancestors to the equality of the imperial ancestors. This act of Empress Dowager Liu was similar to that of Empress Dowager Lu of Han and Empress Dowager Wu of Tang, both of whom were known for their rigid, absolutist, tyrannical and ruthless monarchy.

As a politician, Empress Liu has been described as a competent regent.   Reportedly, she had the ability to appoint able officials and discharge unable ones; to listen, accept and sometime adhere to criticism despite being of a fierce temperament.   She was however, criticized for having usurped the Imperial ceremonies and had herself worshiped as if she were an emperor, and because she appointed her relatives to high offices, because they were of a poor background and considered vulgar.   

As the emperor was twelve years old at the time of his succession, and was legally due to be declared of legal majority at seventeen, she would normally had been expected to step down as regent after five years: however, she refused to do so, and continued to rule until her death. When she died, she left instructions that Consort Yang was to succeed her as the regent of the emperor, but the emperor refused to honor her will.   

During her reign, Emperor Renzong had falsely believed that she was his biological mother, and did not find out otherwise until after her death, which caused him to react with rage. He demoted Liu's relatives and followers and posthumously elevated Lady Li to the rank of empress.

Titles
During the reign of Emperor Taizu of Song (4 February 960 – 14 November 976):
Liu E  (刘娥; from 968)
Lady Liu (劉氏; from 968)
During the reign of Emperor Zhenzong of Song (8 May 997 – 23 March 1022):
Beauty (美人; from 1004)
Lady of Cultivated Deportment (修儀; from 1009)
Virtuous Consort Liu (劉德妃; from 1012)
Empress (皇后; from December 1012)
During the reign of Emperor Renzong of Song (24 March 1022 – 30 April 1063)
Empress Dowager (皇太后: from 1022)
Empress Zhangxian Mingsu (章獻明肅皇后; from 1033)

Ancestry
According to official history, Lady Liu's grandfather Liu Yanqing was a general during the Later Jin and Later Han dynasties. The family later moved from Taiyuan in the north to Jiaozhou in the southwest, where her father Liu Tong assumed office of prefectship, likely during the first years of the newly established Song dynasty which conquered the region in 965.

Notes and references

External links 
 http://www.guide2womenleaders.com/China_Heads.htm

969 births
1033 deaths
Female regents
Song dynasty empresses
The Seven Heroes and Five Gallants characters
10th-century Chinese women
10th-century Chinese people
11th-century Chinese women
11th-century Chinese people
10th-century Chinese musicians
People from Qingdao
People from Jiaozhou City